The Royal Agricultural Society of Tasmania (RAST) is a Tasmanian Agricultural society based at the Hobart Showgrounds.  The RAST organises many of the agricultural shows around Tasmania including the Royal Hobart Show. Originally called the “Van Diemen's Land Agricultural Society” the society was the first agricultural society formed in Australia. The society started in Hobart Town on 1 January 1822. The first show was conducted in January 1822, in the Old Market Place, just in front of the present State Parliament House. In 1922 His Majesty King George V approved the granting of the prefix ‘Royal’ to the Society and which in turn became known as the Royal Agricultural Society of Tasmania.

Annual elections of officers drew interest and participation from varying forms of agriculture over time.

It celebrated its 100th anniversary show in  2004.

Publications

References

External links 
Royal Agricultural Society of Tasmania Website

Agricultural organisations based in Australia
Clubs and societies in Tasmania
1822 establishments in Australia
Organisations based in Australia with royal patronage
Learned societies of Australia
Agriculture in Tasmania